This is a list of broadcast television stations that are licensed in the U.S. state of Alabama.

Full-power stations
VC refers to the station's PSIP virtual channel. RF refers to the station's physical RF channel.

Defunct full-power stations
Channel 26: WYLE - Ind. - Florence (4/19/1986 - 2/8/2007)
Channel 48: WKAB-TV - CBS/Dumont - Mobile (12/29/1952 - 8/1/1954)

LPTV stations

Translators

See also
 Alabama media
 List of newspapers in Alabama
 List of radio stations in Alabama
 Media in cities in Alabama: Birmingham, Huntsville, Mobile, Montgomery, Tuscaloosa
 Alabama Broadcasters Association

References

Bibliography

External links
 
  (Directory ceased in 2017)
 
 
 
 
 

Alabama

Television stations